Avetik Chalabyan (Armenian: Ավետիք Չալաբյան, born 21 November 1972) is an Armenian politician, the former political prisoner, the co-founder of the center-right National Agenda Party. Chalabyan has been detained and arrested on May 12, 2022, as a part of oppression towards the opposition in Armenia. He was released on July 28, 2022.

Biography 
Avetik Chalabyan is a former senior partner of McKinsey & Company. He graduated from Yerevan State University with a master's degree in Theoretical Physics and received his MBA from the University of North Carolina. Chalabyan led McKinsey's global Metallurgical Practice from 2015 to 2020, and currently is a supervisory board member of Metinvest, a large international metals and mining group based in Netherlands. Previously, he had also served as Head of the WTO Affairs Department at the Ministry of Economic Development of Armenia.

Chalabyan is a founding member of the board of trustees of Arar Foundation. He also serves as a board member in the Repat Armenia Foundation, and other social and philanthropic initiatives.

Political activism and arrest 
Chalabyan was outspoken and critical about supporting and recognizing Artsakh, unification of Armenian diaspora, as well as building a defence mechanism to assure the sovereignty of the state.

Chalabyan was prosecuted on May 12, 2012, within the framework of a criminal case initiated under Article 163, Part 3, Clause 2 of the RA Criminal Code, which envisages liability for forcing to participate in a rally or for participating in a meeting to be committed to two or more persons. Judge Arusyak Aleksanyan of the Court of General Jurisdiction in Yerevan granted the investigator's motion to detain Chalabyan as a measure of restraint. The accusation against Chalabyan was based on one edited “secret recording, which is inadmissible evidence in the sense of the RA Criminal Procedure Code, in which Avetik Chalabyan does not claim to offer material interest in participating in rallies.”

"During the face-to-face interrogation insisted that Avetik Chalabyan had never offered him money or other material interest to participate in the rallies. In these conditions, Avetik Chalabyan was illegally charged, the latter was arrested by an illegal court decision. It is clear that the arrest against Avetik Chalabyan is punitive", stated Chalabyan's attorney.

Chalabyan is accused of the act provided for in Article 163, Part 3, Clause 2 of the RA Criminal Code (coercion to participate in meetings). Judge Armen Danielyan of the Yerevan Court of Criminal Appeals refused to release Chalabyan from prison, upholding a lower court ruling. "Armenia Investigative Committee possesses facts, evidence proving Avetik Chalabyan's innocence," said the defendant.

Personal life 
Avetik Chalabyan is married and has four children.

References 

Armenian activists
Living people
1972 births